Nikolay Sergeevich Sazhin (September 15, 1988, Krasnoyarsk, Russia, then USSR) is a former world champion of chess boxing. Sazhin has an Elo rating of 1911. Sazhin's overall record was at that point 49–13–0. His alias is "The Siberian Express" or "The Chairman".

Biography
Sazhin was 19 when he won the title from Frank Stoldt in July 2008. He defended his title, which wasn't actually his, as somebody else had won it in the meantime, in London in March 2012 against Andy Costello winning by checkmate in the 9th round. The news posted on May 20, 2013, revealed that Sazhin's unknown title was sanctioned by World Chessboxing Association (WCBA). In addition, the official website of WCBA showed that Nikolay Sazhin was sanctioned as the current world champion at double weight divisions of Light heavyweight and Heavyweight.

Record

|-  style="background:#CCFFCC;"
| 2012-03-20 || Win ||align=left| Andy "The Rock" Costello || International Chessboxing || London, England || Check Mate || 9 || 
|-
! style=background:white colspan=9 |
|-
|-  style="background:#CCFFCC;"
| 2011-10-22 || Win ||align=left| Andy "The Rock" Costello || International Chessboxing || Krasnoyarsk, Russia ||  ||  || 
|-
|-  style="background:#FFBBBB;"
| 2009-11-28 || Win ||align=left| Leo "Granit" Kraft ||  || Krasnoyarsk, Siberia, Russia || Check Mate || 9 || 
|-
! style=background:white colspan=9 |
|-
|-  style="background:#CCFFCC;"
| 2008-07-05 || Win ||align=left| Frank "Anti Terror" Stoldt || Chessboxing Tournament Berlin 2008 || Berlin, Germany || Check Mate || 9 || 
|-
! style=background:white colspan=9 |
|-
|-
| colspan=9 | Legend:

References

Russian chess players
Living people
Chess boxers
1988 births
Sportspeople from Krasnoyarsk
Russian male boxers